Moskva is a transliteration of "", meaning Moscow in the Russian language.

Moskva may also refer to:

Places
Moskva (inhabited locality), several rural localities in Russia
Moskva (river), central-Russian river on which Moscow lies
787 Moskva, a Main Belt asteroid
Moskva (Almaty Metro), a railway station in Almaty, Kazakhstan

Ships
 Soviet helicopter carrier Moskva
 Moskva-class helicopter carrier
 Russian cruiser Moskva, a Slava class guided missile cruiser, formerly Slava, sunk during the 2022 Russian invasion of Ukraine
 , a diesel-electric icebreaker in service in 1960–1992
 , a diesel-electric icebreaker in service since 2008
 Moskva class, several ship classes
 Moskva (ship), a list of ships named Moskva

Other uses
Moskva, a medium-format camera made by Krasnogorsky Zavod
Moskva, a ZX Spectrum computer clone
Moskva (album), by Russian pop group Glukoza
Moskva (magazine), a Russian literary magazine

See also

Hotel Moskva (disambiguation)

Moscow (disambiguation)
Moskovsky (disambiguation)